Testosterone acetate butyrate, or testosterone 3β-acetate 17β-butanoate, also known as 4-androstenediol acetate butyrate, as well as androst-4-ene-3β,17β-diol 3β-acetate 17β-butanoate, is a synthetic anabolic-androgenic steroid and an androgen ester which was never marketed. It is the 3β-acetate, 17β-butyrate (butanoate) diester of testosterone (androst-4-en-17β-ol-3-one), or, more accurately, of 4-androstenediol (androst-4-ene-3β,17β-diol).

See also
 Testosterone acetate propionate
 Testosterone diacetate
 Testosterone dipropionate
 Bolandiol dipropionate
 Methandriol bisenanthoyl acetate
 Methandriol diacetate
 Methandriol dipropionate

References

Abandoned drugs
Acetate esters
Androgens and anabolic steroids
Androstanes
Butyrate esters
Prodrugs
Testosterone esters